Xiang Chǒng (died 240) was a military officer of the state of Shu Han during the Three Kingdoms period of China. In the Chu Shi Biao, Zhuge Liang named Xiang Chǒng as a capable subject of good character and someone well-versed in military affairs, and urged Liu Shan to put Xiang Chǒng's talents to good use. He was a nephew of the Shu scholar Xiang Lang.

Life
Xiang Chǒng was from Yicheng County (宜城縣), Xiangyang Commandery (襄陽郡), which is around present-day Yicheng, Hubei. His uncle, Xiang Lang, served under Liu Biao, the Governor of Jing Province (covering present-day Hubei and Hunan) in the late Eastern Han dynasty and later under the warlord Liu Bei, the founding emperor of the Shu Han state in the Three Kingdoms period.

Xiang Chǒng started his military career in Shu as an Officer of the Standard (牙門將) during Liu Bei's short reign from 221 to 223. During the Battle of Xiaoting of 221–222, while the Shu forces were retreating after their defeat, only Xiang Chǒng's unit managed to retreat without sustaining any losses along the way. As a result, he received high praise from Liu Bei.

In 223, when Liu Shan became the new emperor of Shu after his father Liu Bei's death, he enfeoffed Xiang Chǒng as a Marquis of a Chief Village (都亭侯) and appointed him as a Central Chief Controller (中都督) among the imperial guards. Around 227 or 228, when Zhuge Liang, the Imperial Chancellor of Shu, was about to launch the first of a series of military campaigns against Shu's rival state Wei, he wrote the Chu Shi Biao to Liu Shan to explain his reasons for waging war against Wei and giving advice to the emperor on governance. 
In the Chu Shi Biao, Zhuge Liang describes Xiang Chǒng as such 

Xiang Chǒng was later promoted to the position of Commandant of the Central Army (中領軍). In 240, he was killed in action while leading Shu forces to suppress a rebellion by local tribes in Hanjia Commandery (漢嘉郡; around present-day Lushan County, Sichuan).

Xiang Chōng (向充)
Xiang Chǒng had a similarly named younger brother, Xiang Chōng (向充), who also served as a military officer in Shu. He initially held the appointments of Colonel of Trainee Archers (射聲校尉) and Master of Writing (尚書) in the imperial secretariat.

When Zhuge Liang died in 234, many people wanted the Shu government to build temples/shrines to commemorate him, but the government refused so many people privately built their own temples/shrines. When Xiang Chōng, then holding the position of a Palace Gentleman of Writing (中書郎), heard about it, he and Xi Long (習隆; an infantry colonel) wrote to the Shu emperor Liu Shan to advise him to build a temple for Zhuge Liang in Mianyang.

Between 240 and 262, when the Shu general Jiang Wei led Shu forces on a series of military campaigns against Shu's rival state Wei, Xiang Chōng and another official, Lai Zhong, served as Jiang Wei's subordinates.

After the fall of Shu in 263, the Wei general Wei Guan found jade ring and seal with the words "Chéng Xìn" or "Achieving Faith" etching on them.  The people of Wei showed them to the officials and discussed about this before keeping it in the State's office. 
Xiang Chōng heard about this and declared 

During the same year, Xiang Chōng entered the service of the Wei government and was appointed as the Administrator (太守) of Zitong Commandery (梓潼郡; around present-day Mianyang, Sichuan). And the next year, Sima Yan became Emperor fulfilling the prophecy of "Yán Rising". Sun Sheng noted that in the past Gongsun Shu rose in Chengdu and his state was named Cheng. Those jade's engraving were probably made by him.

See also
 Lists of people of the Three Kingdoms

References

 Chen, Shou (3rd century). Records of the Three Kingdoms (Sanguozhi).
 Pei, Songzhi (5th century). Annotations to Records of the Three Kingdoms (Sanguozhi zhu).

Year of birth unknown
240 deaths
People of Shu Han
Three Kingdoms people killed in battle